Italo-Ethiopian War, Italo-Abyssinian War or Italian invasion of Ethiopia / Abyssinia may refer to:

Italo-Ethiopian War of 1887–1889, compromise
First Italo-Ethiopian War (1895–1896), won by Ethiopia
Second Italo-Ethiopian War (1935–1936), won by Italy

See also
 Abyssinia Crisis, a 1935 crisis originating in the so-called Walwal incident in the then ongoing conflict between Italy and Ethiopia
 East African Campaign (World War II) of 1940–1941 defeated the Italians and restored the independence of Abyssinia, this time with direct assistance from other powers